Vojvoda Malesija (Cyrillic: Војвода Малесија; 17 July 1970 – 24 December 2021) was a Montenegrin football manager and player.

Playing career
After a playing career that included playing in several top league domestic clubs such as FK Jedinstvo Bijelo Polje, FK Javor Ivanjica, FK Zeta, FK Radnički Niš and FK Radnički Jugopetrol, and also with Russian Premier League club FC Uralan Elista, he retired and became a coach.

Managerial career
Since summer 2009, he has been the main coach of FK Zeta, now playing in the Montenegrin First League.

Personal life and death
Malesija died on 24 December 2021, at the age of 51. His daughter Tanja Malesija plays for the Montenegro women's national youth team.

References

External sources
 
 Profile at official FK Zeta site.

1970 births
2021 deaths
People from Mojkovac
Association football forwards
Yugoslav footballers
Montenegrin footballers
Serbia and Montenegro footballers
FK Javor Ivanjica players
FK Polimlje players
FK Jedinstvo Bijelo Polje players
FK Budućnost Podgorica players
FK Zeta players
FK Radnički Niš players
FC Elista players
FK Radnički Beograd players
Second League of Serbia and Montenegro players
First League of Serbia and Montenegro players
Russian Premier League players
Montenegrin football managers
Expatriate footballers in Russia